Reichsgewerkschaftskommission ('Imperial Trade Union Commission', often referred to as the Vienna Commission) was a trade union centre in the Austrian part of Austria-Hungary. The Vienna Commission was formed in December 1893. Anton Hueber was the head of the Commission.

In 1928, the organisation was refounded as the Federation of Free Trade Unions in Austria, on an industrial union basis.

See also
 Independent Social Democratic Party (Czech Lands)

References

Trade unions in Austria-Hungary
National federations of trade unions
Trade unions established in 1893
1893 establishments in Austria-Hungary
Trade unions disestablished in 1928